Hampshire County Courthouse or Old Hampshire County Courthouse may refer to:

Hampshire County Courthouse (Massachusetts)
Hampshire County Courthouse (West Virginia)